The Twilight Realm is a novel by Christopher Carpenter published in 1985.

Plot summary
The Twilight Realm is a novel in which five role-playing game players are brought into a fantasy world to defeat an evil wizard.

Reception
Neil Gaiman reviewed The Twilight Realm for Imagine magazine, and stated that "Reads like a choose-your-own-adventure game only without the options."

Reviews
Review by Chris Morgan (1985) in Fantasy Review, August 1985

References

1985 novels